Grapheme–color synesthesia or colored grapheme synesthesia is a form of synesthesia in which an individual's perception of numerals and letters is associated with the experience of colors. Like all forms of synesthesia, grapheme–color synesthesia is involuntary, consistent and memorable. Grapheme–color synesthesia is one of the most common forms of synesthesia and, because of the extensive knowledge of the visual system, one of the most studied.

While it is extremely unlikely that any two synesthetes will report the same colors for all letters and numbers, studies of large numbers of synesthetes find that there are some commonalities across letters (e.g., "A" is likely to be red). Early studies argued that grapheme–color synesthesia was not due to associative learning, such as from playing with colored refrigerator magnets. However, one recent study has documented a case of synesthesia in which synesthetic associations could be traced back to colored refrigerator magnets. Despite the existence of this individual case, the majority of synesthetic associations do not seem to be driven by learning of this sort. Rather, it seems that more frequent letters are paired with more frequent colors, and some meaning-based rules, such as ‘b’ being blue, drive most synesthetic associations.

There has been a lot more research as to why and how synesthesia occurs with more recent technology and as synesthesia has become more well known. It has been found that grapheme–color synesthetes have more grey matter in their brain. There is evidence of an increased grey matter volume in the left caudal intraparietal sulcus (IPS). There was also found to be an increased grey matter volume in the right fusiform gyrus. These results are consistent with another study on the brain functioning of grapheme–color synesthetes. Grapheme–color synesthetes tend to have an increased thickness, volume and surface area of the fusiform gyrus. Furthermore, the area of the brain where word, letter and color processing are located, V4a, is where the most significant difference in make-up was found. Though not certain, these differences are thought to be part of the reasoning for the presence of grapheme–color synesthesia.

Experiences and reports
Synesthetes often report that they were unaware their experiences were unusual until they realized other people did not have them, while others report feeling as if they had been keeping a secret their entire lives. Many synesthetes can vividly remember when they first noticed their synesthetic experiences, or when they first learned that such experiences were unusual.  Writer and synesthete Patricia Lynne Duffy remembers one early experience:

As does filmmaker Stephanie Morgenstern:

As reported by poet and screenwriter Stephen Bishop 3rd:

On the other hand, many synesthetes never realize that their experiences are in any way unusual or exceptional.  For example, the Nobel prize winning physicist, Richard Feynman reports:

While synesthetes sometimes report seeing colors projected in space, they do not confuse their synesthetic colors with real colors in the external world.  Rather, they report that they are simultaneously aware of the external color and also the internal, synesthetic color:

Finally, synesthetes are quite precise in the color mappings that they experience, which can lead them to make quite detailed comparisons of their colors:

Further research
Individuals with grapheme–color synesthesia rarely claim that their sensations are problematic or unwanted. In some cases, individuals report useful effects, such as aid in memory or spelling of difficult words.

These experiences have led to the development of technologies intended to improve the retention and memory of graphemes by individuals without synesthesia. Computers, for instance, could use "artificial synesthesia" to color words and numbers to improve usability. A somewhat related example of "computer-aided synesthesia" is using letter coloring in a web browser to prevent IDN homograph attacks. (Someone with synesthesia can sometimes distinguish between barely different looking characters in a similar way.)

References and notes

External links
 

Synesthesia
Color vision